MBS School of Planning and Architecture is the largest architecture institute of New Delhi; it has  an intake of 120 students per year for undergraduate programme in architecture. The college is affiliated to Guru Gobind Singh Indrapratha University (2011- 2012 onward) and is duly approved by the Council of Architecture and the All India Council for Technical Education.

History
The  school was established in 2009 by ACME Educational Trust, New Delhi to impart education in the field of architecture and planning. The college is strategically located in sub-city Dwarka, sector 9, PSP area,  well connected with different regions of Delhi-NCR through road, public transport and Delhi metro.

Infrastructure
The MBS School of Planning and Architecture is well equipped for conducting academic teaching programmes as Surveying and Leveling Laboratory, Climatology Laboratory, Building Material Laboratory, Construction Yards for practical training, Drawing Studios, Computer Laboratory, Architecture Library, Carpentry and Model - Making Workshop and  Art Studio.

Programmes
The school currently offers a B. Arch- 5-year Degree Programme. It hopes to also offer 5-year M.Arch programs with specialties in   Interior Design,  Construction Management, and  Housing. It additionally plans to offer 2-year M. Arch degrees in Design,  Urban Design, Landscape,   Conservation, and Housing. It also plans to offer 3-year Diploma programs.

Admissions

The candidates applying for admission must have cleared 10+2 CBSE or equivalent with minimum 50% aggregate marks, with mathematics as a compulsory subject  or 10+3 Diploma recognized by the Central / State Government of India. They   must have a qualified score of Aptitude Test in Architecture such as NATA (National Aptitude Test in Architecture).

References 

http://mbsarchitecture.org.in/
https://web.archive.org/web/20120430115242/http://www.nata.in/www/default.aspx
http://www.ipu.ac.in/
http://www.coa.gov.in/

Universities and colleges in Delhi
Architecture schools in India